Rustadstuen is a surname. Notable people with the surname include:

Arne Rustadstuen (1905–1978), Norwegian skier
Pål Rustadstuen (born 1982), Norwegian footballer

Norwegian-language surnames